The Pegasus Dwarf Spheroidal (also known as Andromeda VI or Peg dSph for short) is a dwarf spheroidal galaxy about 2.7 million light-years away in the constellation Pegasus. The Pegasus Dwarf is a member of the Local Group and a satellite galaxy of the Andromeda Galaxy (M31).

General information
The Pegasus Dwarf Spheroidal is a galaxy with mainly metal-poor stellar populations. Its metallicity is [Fe/H] ≃ −1.3. It is located at the right ascension 23h51m46.30s and declination +24d34m57.0s in the equatorial coordinate system (epoch J2000.0), and in a distance of 820 ± 20 kpc from Earth and a distance of 294 ± 8 kpc from the Andromeda Galaxy.

The galaxy was discovered in 1999 by various authors on the Second Palomar Observatory Sky Survey (POSS II) films.

See also
 List of Andromeda's satellite galaxies
 Pegasus Dwarf Irregular Galaxy (Peg DIG)
 Pegasus galaxy, the Stargate Atlantis fictional location (probably the Pegasus Dwarf Irregular Galaxy).

Notes 

For an angular distance θ between C and
G, their mutual linear distance R is given by:      R2 = D + D - 2 × Dg × Dc × cos(θ)

References

External links
NASA/IPAC Extragalactic Database: Pegasus Dwarf Spheroidal
Armandroff, Jacoby, & Davies, "Low Surface Brightness Galaxies around M31", Astrophys. J. 118, 1220-1229 (1999).

Dwarf spheroidal galaxies
2807158
Local Group
Low surface brightness galaxies
Andromeda Subgroup
Pegasus (constellation)
Astronomical objects discovered in 1999